St. Anna is an unincorporated community in Avon Township, Stearns County, Minnesota, United States.  The community is located near the junction of Stearns County Roads 9 and 154. The community contains one property listed on the National Register of Historic Places: the 1902 Church of the Immaculate Conception.

References

Unincorporated communities in Stearns County, Minnesota
Unincorporated communities in Minnesota